The Rochester Bestiary (London, British Library, Royal MS 12 F.xiii) is a richly illuminated manuscript copy of a medieval bestiary, a book describing the appearance and habits of a large number of familiar and exotic animals, both real and legendary. The animals' characteristics are frequently allegorised, with the addition of a Christian moral.

The bestiary tradition

The medieval bestiary ultimately derives from the Greek-language Physiologus, a text whose precise date and place of origin is disputed, but which was most likely written in North Africa sometime in the second or third century. The Physiologus was translated into Latin several times, at least as far back as the eighth century, the date of the first extant manuscripts, and likely much earlier, perhaps the fourth century.  While the earliest Latin translations were extremely faithful to their Greek source, later versions adapted more freely, particularly by the inclusion of additional information from other sources, including Pliny's Historia naturalis, and, most significantly, Isidore of Seville's Etymologies. The most important of the Latin Physiologus translations — the one now known by scholars as the "B Version" — was expanded even further in the twelfth century (most likely in the 1160s or 1170s), with more additions from Isidore, to become the so-called "Second Family" standard form of what now may be properly termed as the bestiary. This text was much longer than the original Physiologus and included in its typical format over 100 sections, distributed among nine major divisions of varying size. The first division included 44 animals or beasts and the second 35 birds, followed by a large division on different varieties of snakes, and divisions on worms, fish, trees, precious stones, and the nature and ages of man. Manuscripts from this most familiar version of the bestiary were produced from the  twelfth to sixteenth centuries, with most dating from the thirteenth century.

Manuscript description

The Rochester Bestiary is a parchment manuscript dating from c. 1230–1240. Its principle contents are a bestiary, but it also contains a short lapidary (a treatise on stones) in French prose and, as the flyleaves, two leaves of a 14th-century service book. It is illustrated with 55 finished miniatures of various animals, each at the end of the passage describing that animal. On some pages, instructions to the illuminator are visible, briefly describing what the planned picture should depict. About a third of the way through the manuscript (f. 52v and following, after the vulture), the illustrations cease: while spaces remain where they were intended to be placed, no illustrations were ever added. The style of the miniatures shows some evidence that the illustrations were made as much as a decade or more after the initial production of the text, and it is possible that the artist did not fully understand the projected plan envisioned by the scribe: by adding a fourth picture of a lion, instead of the planned three, he forced subsequent illustrations to be placed after the animals they described, instead of before. Three other extant manuscripts feature illuminations by this artist: Cambridge, University Library, MS. Ee.2.23 (a Bible), Peterborough, Cathedral Library, MS. 10 (a Bible), and Stockholm, National Museum, MS. B. 2010 (a psalter). A fourth manuscript (Turin, Biblioteca Nazionale, Cod. L.IV.25) contained two full-page miniatures from this artist, but was destroyed in 1904.

History of the manuscript
The manuscript is usually assumed to have been made at St. Andrew's Priory at Rochester Cathedral. An inscription places the book there with certainty in the fourteenth century. At some point, it appears that the book was stolen from the priory, as another fourteenth-century inscription notes its return by a "brother John Malling," who may have been the culprit: a man named John Malling was excommunicated in 1387 as an apostate and thief. By 1542 it was in the possession of the king, as it is listed in an inventory of the royal library at Westminster in that year. King George II donated it, together with the rest of the Old Royal Library, to the British Museum in 1757, and it is now at the British Library.

Adaptation of the text in the Rochester manuscript
Additions to the standard bestiary text have been made in the Rochester Bestiary by drawing from Part IV of the Pantheologus by Peter of Aldgate. A complete copy of the Pantheologus, now extant as British Library, Royal MS. 7 E.viii, was located in Rochester in the early 13th century, and may have been the direct source for the bestiary additions.

The animals

The bestiary features the following animals: 

Lion
Tiger
Leopard
Panther
Antelope
Unicorn ("which is called 'rhinoceros' by the Greeks")
Lynx
Griffin
Elephant
Beaver
Ibex
Hyena
Bonasus (an Asian animal with a bull's head and curling horns)
Ape
Satyr
Stag
Goat
She-goat
Monocerus
Bear
Leucrota (an Indian animal with the body of a lion and the head of a horse)
Crocodile
Manticore (an Indian animal with the face of a man and the body of a lion)
Parandrus (an Ethiopian animal sometimes identified as a reindeer or elk)
Fox
Yale (an animal with the tail of an elephant and the jaws of a goat)
Wolf
Dog
Sheep
Ram (male sheep) and wether (castrated male sheep)
Lamb
He-goat and kid
Boar
Bull
Ox and wild ox
Camel
Dromedary
Ass
Onager (wild ass)
Horse
Cat
Mouse
Weasel
Mole
Hedgehog
Ant
Eagle
Vulture
Crane
Parrot
Caladrius (a white bird capable of predicting the outcome of an illness)
Swan
Stork
Ibis
Coot
Ostrich
Kingfisher
Heron
Goose
Horned owl
Small owl or night raven
Phoenix
Cinnamolgus (an Arabian bird that nests in the cinnamon tree)
Hercinia (a German bird that glows in the dark)
Hoopoe
Pelican
Siren (half-human, half-bird)
Partridge
Quail
Magpie and woodpecker
Hawk
Gull
Tawny owl
Bat
Raven
Crow
Dove
Turtledove
Tern
Peacock
Cock
Hen
Duck
Bee
Peridexion tree (an Indian tree whose shadow frightens dragons)
Asp
Dragon
Basilisk (the "king of serpents," since it can kill other serpents with its odor)
Viper
Scitalis (a snake that can hypnotize with its shining back)
Amphisbaena (a snake with two heads)
Hydrus (a sea serpent that, when swallowed by a crocodile, bursts out of its stomach, killing it)
Jaculus (a winged serpent)
Boa
Siren serpent (a winged serpent from Arabia)
Seps (a snake whose venom dissolves the bones as well as flesh of its prey)
Dipsa (a snake whose venom is so poisonous, it kills before the victim perceives the bite)
Salamander
Saura lizard (a lizard that renews its eyesight by looking at the sun)
Gecko
Snake
Scorpion
Various types of "worm", including the spider, the locust, the flea, etc.
Various types of "fish", including the whale, the dolphin, the crocodile, the sea urchin, and other sea animals
Various types of trees, including the palm, the laurel, the fig, the mulberry, etc.
Long section on the nature of man and the parts of the human body
Fire stones (which ignite when brought together)

A French-language lapidary follows directly on the Latin description of fire stones, giving further descriptions of a large number of stones, including the magnet, coral, carnelian, ceraunius (the "thunder-stone"), crystal, and many others.

Notes

References

External links
 Full photographic reproduction of Royal MS 12 F.xiii from the British Library Digitised Manuscripts website

13th-century illuminated manuscripts
Bestiaries
British Library Royal manuscripts